Green Left Party is a left-libertarian and green party in Turkey. It was founded on 25 November 2012 with the name Party of Greens and the Left Future as a merger of the Greens Party and the Equality and Democracy Party. The party changed its name in April 2016.

Prominent members include Murat Belge, left-wing political author and columnist for Taraf; Kutluğ Ataman, filmmaker and contemporary artist; and Ufuk Uras, former Istanbul deputy and president of the Freedom and Solidarity Party (ÖDP).

History 
The party is one of the participants in the Peoples' Democratic Congress (HDK), a political initiative instrumental in founding the Peoples' Democratic Party (HDP) in 2012.

Their chairpersons were temporarily arrested in February 2018 but released with a travel ban for the exterior and under monitoring of the police. They were charged over social media activity and books in their possession.

Political positions 
The party has formally acknowledged the Armenian genocide.

References

2012 establishments in Turkey
Alter-globalization
Anti-capitalist political parties
Direct democracy parties
Ecosocialist parties
Feminist parties in Turkey
Green parties in Asia
Green parties in Europe
Left-wing parties
Left-wing politics in Turkey
Peoples' Democratic Congress
Political parties established in 2012
Political parties in Turkey
Secularism in Turkey
Socialist parties in Turkey